Matheus Augusto dos Reis da Silva (born 3 April 1999), commonly known as Matheus Augusto, is a Brazilian footballer who currently plays as a forward for Vitória.

Career statistics

Club

Notes

References

1996 births
Living people
Brazilian footballers
Brazilian expatriate footballers
Brazil youth international footballers
Association football forwards
Football League (Greece) players
Campeonato Brasileiro Série B players
Santos FC players
A.E. Sparta P.A.E. players
Esporte Clube Vitória players
Brazilian expatriate sportspeople in Greece
Expatriate footballers in Greece